Manezhnaya Square,  may refer to:

 Manezhnaya Square, Moscow
 Manezhnaya Square, Saint Petersburg